Phoutlamphay Thiamphasone (born September 9, 1979) is an athlete from Laos, who competed in archery.

Phoutlamphay competed at the 2004 Summer Olympics in men's individual archery.  He was defeated in the first round of elimination by Magnus Petersson of Sweden, he placed 64th overall.

References
sports-reference

External links
 

1979 births
Living people
Archers at the 2004 Summer Olympics
Olympic archers of Laos
Laotian male archers
21st-century Laotian people